St. Mary's Simhasana Church (Vadayaparambu simhasana Palli), Vadayaparambu is one of the prominent Syriac Orthodox churches in Kerala. The church was established in 1975 by Dr. Geevarghese Mor Gregorios (Perumpally Thirumeni). The church is headed by the "Patriarch of Antioch"  and functions under the spiritual supremacy of the Syriac Orthodox Patriarchate of Antioch and all the East and the Regional church headquarters is at Puthencuriz, Kochi.

History
Dispute over the power of the Mar Bahanan Syrian Orthodox Church, Vadayaparambu between Indian Orthodox Church and Malankara Jacobite Syriac Orthodox Church lead to the establishment of this church and some fraction of the members came and created this one.

Important festivals 
Mathavinte Perunnal on 15 August is the main celebration in the church. The best attraction of the festival is the procession. Festival of "St.George" on May 1 every year is another important festival of this church. Denaha (Annual celebration of the holy Baptism of Christ) on 6 January is the other main celebration in the church."Soonoro" of "Holy Virgin Mary","Thirusheshippu" of H.H Moran Mor Ignathious Elias III (Patriarch of Antioch and all the East (Omallur Bava) and "Bahanan Sahada was installed at this church".

External links
 Reference from Malankara Jacobite Syriac Orthodox Church website

Churches in Ernakulam district
Malankara Orthodox Syrian church buildings
20th-century Oriental Orthodox church buildings
Churches completed in 1975
20th-century churches in India